Jiang Xin (born 18 January 1969) is a Chinese former badminton player who later move to Australia and run a badminton school in Melbourne. He was the bronze medalists at the 1994 Asian Games in the men's doubles and team events. Jiang competed at the 1996 Summer Olympics in the men's doubles teamed-up with Huang Zhanzhong.

Achievements

World Cup 
Mixed doubles

Asian Games 
Men's doubles

Asian Championships 
Men's doubles

Mixed doubles

Asian Cup 
Men's doubles

East Asian Games 
Men's doubles

IBF World Grand Prix 
The World Badminton Grand Prix sanctioned by International Badminton Federation (IBF) since from 1983 to 2006.

Men's doubles

Mixed doubles

IBF International 
Men's doubles

References

External links
 

1969 births
Living people
Chinese male badminton players
Badminton players at the 1996 Summer Olympics
Olympic badminton players of China
Badminton players at the 1994 Asian Games
Asian Games bronze medalists for China
Asian Games medalists in badminton
Medalists at the 1994 Asian Games
Chinese emigrants to Australia
Chinese expatriate sportspeople in Australia
Sportspeople from Melbourne
Australian male badminton players
Chinese badminton coaches